Lee Feinswog (born August 12, 1954, in West Long Branch, New Jersey) is an American author and journalist noted for being the executive producer and host of the TV shows Sports Monday and Sports 225 in Baton Rouge, Louisiana. He is the editor of VolleyballMag.com (Volleyball magazine) and also contributes to the Baton Rouge magazine 225. His books include Tales From the LSU Sidelines (2002) andHoopDaddy (2006). He also was a contributing author to What It Means To Be a Tiger (2010).

Early years: 1954-1977

Feinswog, the son of Harold "Cy" Feinswog and Joan Mirman Feinswog, grew up with his younger sister, Sue, in Stony Brook, New York. A 1972 graduate of Ward Melville High School, he was captain of the swim team and editor of his school newspaper. He later attended Syracuse University (1972–1975) where he swam his freshman year and played three years of water polo. He graduated from Southern Illinois University at Carbondale in 1977 with a degree in journalism.

Missouri to Baton Rouge, Louisiana: 1978-present

Feinswog worked as a sportswriter for the Hannibal, Missouri Courier-Post in 1978 and was sports editor for the Raytown, Missouri, weekly group until 1981. He manned the sports desk at the Winston-Salem Journal from 1981 to 1984 and was a sportswriter at the Baton Rouge Advocate from 1984 to 1998. He began Sports Monday on September 25, 1995, and remains the executive producer and host of the show since renamed Sports 225 (in August 2011). Feinswog was the recipient of the 1987 and 1996 Louisiana Sports Writers Association Columnist of the Year awards.

Fathers and sons: HoopDaddy

HoopDaddy was Feinswog's intimate look at how basketball can unite fathers and sons including himself and his son, Kirk.

Bibliography
 Tales From the LSU Sidelines (2002) Sports Publishing
 HoopDaddy (2006) Stuart Bruce Publishing

External links
VolleyballMag.com

American male journalists
1954 births
Living people
People from Stony Brook, New York
People from West Long Branch, New Jersey
Ward Melville High School alumni
Syracuse University alumni
Southern Illinois University alumni